Sharon Tavengwa (born 9 December 1983 in Chirumanzu) is a Zimbabwean long-distance runner. She competed in the marathon at the 2012 Summer Olympics but did not finish the race.

References

1983 births
Living people
Sportspeople from Midlands Province
Zimbabwean female long-distance runners
Olympic athletes of Zimbabwe
Athletes (track and field) at the 2012 Summer Olympics
Zimbabwean female marathon runners